Solberga Abbey (Swedish: Solberga kloster), was a Cistercian nunnery in Sweden, in operation from 1246 until at least 1469. It was located outside Visby on Gotland until 1404, and then in Visby. It was the only nunnery on the island of Gotland.

History
Solberga Abbey was likely a daughter convent of Vreta Abbey. On 12 August 1246, Bishop Laurentius of Linköping mentions that the first nuns had been sent to Gotland. This likely refers to Solberga, which was the only nunnery on the island. In contrast to what was previously believed, Solberga was a large convent with many members. It had both an abbess and a prioress. In 1361, many fallen from the Battle of Visby was buried on the abbey's land, where a cross, which still stands, was erected.

The abbey was presumably destroyed by the war between the Victual Brothers, the Teutonic Knights and the forces of the Kalmar Union in 1398–1403. In 1404, the abbess applied for help from the Master of the Teutonic Knights in Prussia, then in control of Gotland, to found a new abbey. The nuns were allowed to reside in the St. Jacob chapel in Visby. From 1469, they lived by the St. Gertrud chapel in Visby. During the 15th century, the nuns were still, event though no longer in residence at Solberga, referred to as the Solberga nuns. It is not known exactly when the nunnery was dissolved. It may not have lasted until the reformation. By 1469, the nuns were described as "the diminished nuns of Visby".

Sources
 Thordeman, Bengt: Korsbetningen och Solberga kloster utanför Visby, 1930, .
 Dick Wase, Kyrkorna i Visby, i Gotländskt arkiv 1990.
 Dick Wase, Kyrkorna i Visby - nya rön, i Gotländskt arkiv 2002.

Cistercian nunneries in Sweden
1246 establishments in Europe
13th-century establishments in Sweden
Christian monasteries established in the 13th century
Medieval Sweden